The 2000 edition of the Copa Libertadores was the 41st in the tournament's history. It was held between February 15 and June 21. Thirty-two teams participated in this event.

First round

Teams in green qualified to the next round

Group 1

Group 2

Group 3

Group 4

Group 5

Group 6

Group 7

Group 8

Knockout phase

Bracket

Round of 16

Quarter-finals

Semi-finals

Finals

Champion

References

CONMEBOL: Copa Toyota Libertadores 2000

1
Copa Libertadores seasons